The Richmond National Battlefield Park commemorates 13 American Civil War sites around Richmond, Virginia, which served as the capital of the Confederate States of America for most of the war. The park connects certain features within the city with defensive fortifications and battle sites around it.

Richmond in the American Civil War
Virginia voted to secede from the United States in May 1861, and became part of the Confederacy. As a major manufacturing centre, Richmond was soon chosen to be the Confederate capital. The environs of the city would witness much combat over the next four years.

Richmond National Battlefield Park occupies almost 3000 acres in the coastal plain of Virginia, bounded by the James and Chickahominy River watersheds, much of it preserved as it would have looked in the civil war, with scenic meadows and old-growth forest enabling abundant wildlife.

Richmond National Battlefield Park sites in Richmond

Tredegar Iron Works
The chief ironworks of the Confederacy, and a big factor in the decision to make Richmond its capital. It supplied about half the artillery used by the Confederate States Army. Visitors centre and Civil War museum, National Park Service Rangers, interactive theaters, plasma-screen maps.

Chimborazo Hospital
The Confederacy's biggest hospital camp, accommodating up to 4000 patients at a time, mainly for convalescence. Museum with surgical and medical displays, filmshow.

Campaigns affecting Richmond: protected sites

Peninsula Campaign
(17 March - 31 May 1862)

This was McClellan’s attempt to attack Richmond from the east, via the James River. Although obstructed by Confederate artillery, he managed to approach within four miles of the city, but was stopped in a surprise attack by General Joseph E. Johnston.

Chicakhominy Bluffs
Trying to take Richmond, McClellan was halted by this natural defensive barrier with the river at spring flood-level, and parts of his army separated from each other by the mile-wide waterway.

Drewry's Bluff
A sharp bend on the James River, whose defensive battery was too high for the Union Navy’s guns to engage. The fleet had to withdraw, delaying McClellan’s proposed advance on Richmond.

The Seven Days Battles
(25 June  -  1 July 1862)

A rapid sequence of battles (sometimes reckoned as part of the Peninsula Campaign), initiated by the newly-appointed Confederate commander Robert E. Lee. McClellan soon had to retreat, but Lee failed in his plan to cut-off the Union army.

Beaver Dam Creek
Also called Mechanicsville. Lee’s partner ‘Stonewall’ Jackson arrived (untypically) late, and the Confederates took heavy casualties, though the Union army retreated downstream to a safer position. Walking trail along the lower section of the creek.

Gaines' Mill
McClellan’s defenses seemed impregnable, but Lee mounted his biggest attack of the war with 57,000 men, and McClellan retreated to the James River, abandoning his campaign to take Richmond. Walking trails, interpretive signs.

Glendale
Lee saw an opportunity to cut-off McClellan’s army from the river, but Union counter-attacks saved their line of retreat. Several Union generals were wounded and General George A. McCall was captured. Visitor Centre, seasonal.

Malvern Hill
Last of the Seven Days Battles. A tactical win for the Union, largely due to superior artillery, but their commander McClellan was absent, reconnoitring Harrison’s Landing, to where his army soon retreated. Visitor Centre, walking tour, driving tour.

The Overland Campaign
(4 May  -  12 June 1864)
 
In U.S. Grant’s first campaign as General-in-Chief, he operated in the field, alongside the army commander George Meade. It started with a standoff at the Battle of the Wilderness, followed by two defeats at Spotsylvania Court House and Cold Harbor.

Totopotomoy Creek
A failed attempt by Grant to lure Lee into open terrain. The Confederates were securely entrenched behind the creek, and resisted all assaults. The splendid mansion of Rural Plains survived much bombardment. Tour of Rural Plains (Shelton House).

Cold Harbor
After some early success, Grant’s massive frontal assault against Lee’s fortified positions was beaten back with huge casualties. Grant said it was his biggest regret. But it would be Lee’s last victory. Visitor centre and forest trail with interpretive displays.

Siege of Petersburg
(June 14, 1864  -  April 2, 1865)

After his reverses in the Overland Campaign, U.S. Grant settled into a siege, where he could bring his superior numbers to bear on Lee's over-stretched and starving Confederates. When Petersburg fell, the early surrender of Richmond was inevitable.

Fort Harrison 
A key fortification in the defense of Richmond, it was captured by Benjamin Butler, causing Lee to move his whole line west. It was renamed Fort Burnham for a brigade commander killed in the action. Visitor centre, seasonal.

Howlett Line 
This was a defensive earthworks across the Bermuda Hundred peninsula, which enabled a small Confederate force to keep Benjamin Butler’s army at bay ‘like a cork in a bottle’, in U.S. Grant’s phrase.

See also
Petersburg National Battlefield, covering southern portions of the Richmond-Petersburg Campaign.
Richmond National Cemetery, located at the site of the Battle of Seven Pines
Seven Pines National Cemetery, located at the site of the Battle of Seven Pines
Glendale National Cemetery, located at the site of the Battle of Glendale
Fort Harrison National Cemetery

References

 The National Parks: Index 2001-2003. Washington: U.S. Department of the Interior.

External links

 Official NPS website: Richmond National Battlefield Park
 Richmond, Virginia, a National Park Service Discover Our Shared Heritage Travel Itinerary
 Powhite, Mechanicsville, Hanover County, VA Pohwhite at the Historic American Buildings Survey (HABS)

 
Battlefields of the Eastern Theater of the American Civil War
Virginia in the American Civil War
National Register of Historic Places in Hanover County, Virginia
National Park Service areas in Virginia
Protected areas established in 1936
American Civil War museums in Virginia
Museums in Richmond, Virginia
Parks in Chesterfield County, Virginia
Parks in Henrico County, Virginia
Parks in Richmond, Virginia
1936 establishments in Virginia
Historic districts on the National Register of Historic Places in Virginia
National Battlefields and Military Parks of the United States